Naucratinae is a subfamily of ray-finned fish from the family Carangidae which consists of five genera and 13 species.

Genera
The following genera are classified within the Naucratinae:

 Campogramma Regan, 1903
 Elagatis F.D. Bennett, 1840
 Naucrates Rafinesque, 1810
 Seriola Bleeker, 1854
 Seriolina Wakiya, 1924

References

 
Carangidae
Fish subfamilies